HMS Champion was a  light cruiser of the Royal Navy that saw service during World War I. She was part of the Calliope group of the C class.

Construction 
Eight light cruisers were ordered for the Royal Navy in the 1913 budget. Champion and Calliope tested different designs.

Built by Hawthorn Leslie and Company at Tyneside, England, Champion was laid down on 9 March 1914, launched on 29 May 1915, and completed in December 1915.

Champion had two propeller shafts, the port one being driven from the sternmost engine room and the starboard one from forward. Gearing increased overall engine efficiency, allowing a reduction in boiler and turbine size for a given force provided by the propellers, so the initial design reduced the boiler room size and dropped the nominal developed power from 40,000 shaft horsepower (shp) (29.8 megawatts/MW) to 37,500 shp (28 MW).  However, during construction modifications were made to again increase boiler capacity and add cruising turbines which returned to the nominal power output of the Caroline class ungeared ships. Maximum propeller speed was a nominal 340 revolutions per minute. Trials comparing Champion to Caroline showed that at actual developed  power of 41,000 shp (30.6 MW) in both ships, Champion achieved a speed of 29.5 knots using 470 tons of fuel per day, while Caroline achieved 29 knots using 550 tons of fuel per day.  The ship could achieve 28 knots operating at the lower power of 31,000 shp (23 MW).

Service history

World War I 
Champion was commissioned into service in the Royal Navy on 20 December 1915.  She was assigned to the Grand Fleet upon completion, serving as the leader of the 13th Destroyer Flotilla through the end of World War I and until early 1919. She fought in the Battle of Jutland on 31 May-1 June 1916, during which she also was the flagship of Commodore (D), the senior commander of the fleets destroyers.

Postwar 
Champion briefly served in the 2nd Light Cruiser Squadron during 1919. She then was attached to the Royal Navy Torpedo School, HMS Vernon, from 1919 to 1924, undergoing a refit in 1923. She was decommissioned and placed under dockyard control at Portsmouth in October 1924.

In May 1925, Champion was recommissioned to serve as Gunnery Firing Ship. She was attached to the Signal School in 1928, and was used as a testbed for the Royal Navys first remote-power-control (RPC) gunnery systems that year. She was decommissioned in December 1933 and placed under dockyard control.

Disposal 
Champion was sold on 28 July 1934 to Metal Industries of Rosyth, Scotland, for scrapping.

Notes

References

External links 
Ships of the Calliope class

External links 
 
 Battle of Jutland Crew Lists Project – HMS Champion Crew List

C-class cruisers
Ships built on the River Tyne
1915 ships
World War I cruisers of the United Kingdom